This is the complete list of Asian Games medalists in archery from 1978 to 2018.

Men

Individual recurve

Individual recurve 30 m

Individual recurve 50 m

Individual recurve 70 m

Individual recurve 90 m

Team recurve

Individual compound

Team compound

Women

Individual recurve

Individual recurve 30 m

Individual recurve 50 m

Individual recurve 60 m

Individual recurve 70 m

Team recurve

Individual compound

Team compound

Mixed

Team recurve

Team compound

References
Medallists from previous Asian Games – Men's Individual
Medallists from previous Asian Games – Men's Discontinued Events
Medallists from previous Asian Games – Women's Individual
Medallists from previous Asian Games – Women's Discontinued Events

External links

 Medalists from previous Asian Games – Archery
 Men's team medalists
 Women's team medalists

Archery
medalists

Asian Games